Hemirhopalum is a genus of beetles in the family Dermestidae, containing the following species:

 Hemirhopalum apicale Pic, 1954
 Hemirhopalum bicolor Sharp, 1902
 Hemirhopalum buprestoide Sharp, 1902
 Hemirhopalum clythraeforme Sharp, 1902
 Hemirhopalum curtum Pic, 1942
 Hemirhopalum cyaneum Pic, 1927
 Hemirhopalum elongatum Pic, 1942
 Hemirhopalum hadrotomoide Sharp, 1902
 Hemirhopalum impressum Pic, 1936
 Hemirhopalum longipenne Pic, 1916
 Hemirhopalum rufipenne Pic, 1916
 Hemirhopalum suturale Pic, 1937
 Hemirhopalum testaceipes Pic, 1936

References

Dermestidae